Cyril Hubert Marie Bourlon de Rouvre is a French businessman and politician, born 19 December 1945 at Boulogne-Billancourt.

Biography

Education and early career 
Son of Évrard Bourlon de Rouvre, an industrialist, and his wife Claude Genty, Cyril Bourlon de Rouvre is the heir of sugar refineries and the landed property of his great-grandfather, Charles Bourlon de Rouvre (1850–1924), himself stepson of one of the richest men at the end of the 19th century, Gustave Lebaudy.

After studies at the collège Maspero in Paris, then at the collège Saint-Martin de France in Pontoise, the Oratory School in Reading, the Collège Saint-Jean in Fribourg and at the Lycée Janson-de-Sailly, Cyril Bourlon de Rouvre studied electrical engineering at Jussieu before graduating as an aerospace engineer at the Institut polytechnique des sciences avancées.

He first worked at Électricité de France before serving his conscription and started his career as a sales engineer at the Elliot Automation company (1966–1968) before being Director of export of the Sucre Union company (1971–1973). He was business manager of the sales support department of the Lara audiovisual company (1973), then commercial agent in the audiovisual (1974–1975) and associate director at the Auto Racing company (1977).

A young and dynamic business leader 
In 1979, upon the death of his father (who was murdered by his valet), he inherited large real estate holdings, a sugar refinery and 28 companies. He became CEO of Financière Robur et de Cofragec (1982–1992), Coficine (1984–1992) and many other companies.

He modernized the sugar factory and his inheritance prospered. In 1981, he took control of the holding Fraissinet, owner of the business airline Transair. In 1987, he started a new career in film distribution by acquiring, from the producer Robert Dorfmann, by one of its companies, the Financière Robur, Cofragec company with its catalog of 650 films including La Grande Vadrouille or La Vache et le Prisonnier. He produced movies including La Nuit bengali (1988) of Nicolas Klotz, Les Deux Fragonard (1989) of Philippe Le Guay, and La Peste (1992) of Luis Puenzo. He also invested in real estate, including a hotel in Tahiti.

Passionate about cars and racing, he rallied with Thierry Sabine, including Abidjan-Nice driving a Range Rover.

Political life in Haute-Marne and investment in Formula 1 
In 1989, he started a political career in Haute-Marne, a department where his grandfather was a deputy during the Third Republic. He was elected mayor of Chaumont, as an independent (classified as miscellaneous right) against the centrist senator and mayor Georges Berchet, and regional councilor for the Champagne-Ardenne region (1992–1998).

He takes his team as an alderman, a man of 25 years, Luc Chatel, becoming the first "political godfather".

Owner of the Formula 1 team AGS from March 1989 to 1991, he swallowed $18 million and began selling activities of his group, about 70 companies: First Transair, then the sugar factory, sold to the Compagnie de Navigation Mixte, and in 1992, the catalog of movies, lent to UGC in the form of a merger. In 1991, he sold AGS to the Italians Gabriele Rafanelli and Patrizio Cantu.

In 1992, Cyril de Rouvre bought the Formula 1 team Ligier for an estimated price of 200 million francs. With its new owner, the team started to again be competitive – the 1993 season was a success, with a 5th place in the constructor's championship (the team's best result since 1986). But the involvement of Cyril de Rouvre lasted only one season because of legal troubles.

The legal troubles and the decline 
On 5 May 1993, a complaint for fraud was filed against de Rouvre by Guy Verrecchia and Alain Sussfeld, the leaders of UGC, following the June 1992 takeover of Cofragec. The company had been emptied of its assets, leaving a liability estimated at 172.6 million francs. De Rouvre had promised to repay this sum by the end of 1992, but at that time, he still owed 100 million. He was incarcerated by Judge Eva Joly at the Fleury-Mérogis Prison on 14 December 1993, spending two months in prison.

In early 1994, he sold Ligier to Flavio Briatore.

He lost the mayoralty of Chaumont at the French municipal elections of 1995.

In 1996, a judicial investigation was opened against him at the Tribunal de grande instance of Chaumont. He appeared before the Criminal Court of this city in September 1999 for tax evasion. Knowing that the prosecution had requested a sentence of three years imprisonment and a 20-year ban on company management, he was sentenced on 19 December 1999, his birthday, to a suspended sentence of 18 months imprisonment, a ban from managing a company for 3 years, and a large fine.

Bibliography 
 Who's Who in France, 2002–2003, Levallois-Perret, Jacques Lafitte Editions, 2002, p. 1648

References 

Living people
People from Boulogne-Billancourt
Institut Polytechnique des Sciences Avancées alumni
French businesspeople
1945 births
Formula One team owners
Formula One team principals